Morning View is the fourth studio album by American rock band Incubus, released October 23, 2001, through Epic Records. A companion DVD, The Morning View Sessions, was released on May 29, 2002. Continuing the move away from nu metal, the album ranges widely from soft to hard rock sounds in the style of alternative rock. Morning View was the last Incubus album to feature bassist Alex Katunich.

With the album producing the popular singles "Wish You Were Here" and "Nice to Know You," Morning View generally achieved critical praise and went double-platinum, making it the band's highest selling album.

Background and recording

To record the album, the band lived in Malibu, California, on a street called "Morning View Drive". Former bassist Alex Katunich (aka "Dirk Lance") noted that the band had previously "tried to do that for at least the writing portion of Make Yourself, but we didn't have enough clout at the time. When we were getting ready to write this one, we knew that we needed to get into a more creative place. The idea was to not feel as if you were driving [somewhere] to work on a record. You could just get up and it was a natural extension of your day."

Vocalist Brandon Boyd stated that the band "needed quick access to the beach because we're kinda spoiled brats sometimes. We need that outlet. At least I do. It's nice to write music all day and be like, 'I'm going to take a break, see you guys in two hours.'"

Out of the 30 songs the band sketched out for the album, 13 ended up on the final release. One of the unreleased songs called "Anything" was later released on the compilation album Monuments and Melodies. Other songs also added to Monuments and Melodies were "Wish You Were Here", "Nice to Know You", "Warning", "Are You In?", and "Mexico".

Album title
Former bassist Alex Katunich (aka "Dirk Lance") stated that the album's title comes from "the name of the street the house was on where we recorded the album." Boyd notes that "every time we'd pull into the street we had the view of the ocean and Pacific Coast Highway. I got a big creative boner every time I'd show up to the house. Every time we'd pull up, DJ Kilmore would be like, 'Ah, Morning View. It's time to rock!'"

Music
Morning View features a variety of styles: ambience, aggression, and groove. It has an overall softer sound than previous albums, especially apparent on songs like "Echo" and "Are You In?"; however, Incubus's heavier side is still evident on tracks like "Have You Ever" and "Under My Umbrella." Regarding the album's sound, guitarist Mike Einziger notes that it: "would've been really easy for us to try to replicate certain songs that did well on our last record, which we didn't do. We didn't do anything even remotely close to that. We put pressure on ourselves to make a good record because if none of us were happy with it, we'll all be miserable for the next two years while we're on tour."

The final song, "Aqueous Transmission", employs the use of Chinese instruments such as the pipa and is accompanied by a Japanese orchestra. The pipa used on the recording was given to Mike Einziger from Steve Vai. "Aqueous Transmission" is 7 minutes and 46 seconds long, with the last minute consisting of frogs croaking outside the studio in Malibu. Boyd joked that the song was intended to make "the listener pee in his/her pants" from relaxation.

The album also contains an acoustic ballad similar to "Drive" – "Mexico", complete with strings.

Touring and promotion
Morning View boasted a total of five singles beginning with "Wish You Were Here" released on August 14, 2001. Despite the filming of an alternative music video, as the banned original version closely mirrored the September 11 attacks, "Wish You Were Here" gained significant rotation and charted well.

Its follow up, "Nice to Know You," and third single, "Warning,"  both gained substantial airplay as well. "Are You In?" had a video exclusive to Europe due to its sensual nature and gained little attention compared to its predecessors, as did the final single, "Circles." Five years after the album's release, an official video for latter was released on December 3, 2006, on Sony BMG Musicbox.

Once they finished recording their new album, Incubus began touring with Hundred Reasons in Europe from June until the first week of July. They were also invited to play Moby's Area:One Festival alongside the likes of Outkast, The Roots, Paul Oakenfold, Carl Cox, and Nelly Furtado. In August, the band performed their first shows in Australia and Japan before returning to the US for their long-awaited headlining tour; joining their long-time friends from California, Hoobastank and Phantom Planet, Incubus embarked on the Honda Civic Tour which kept ticket prices low through sponsorship and saw the band give away cars to fans. Amidst touring, Incubus was still experiencing commercial milestones for their previous album. They continued to headline throughout the remainder of the year, and were one of the first bands to play in New York City following the September 11 attacks, with the event not affecting the band's touring schedule. DJ Chris Kilmore told Billboard in November 2001, "we’re taking the stand that we’re not going to let some idiot who just wants to kill everybody affect our lives. We’re just going to keep doing what we do, and hopefully, everything will be alright."

In January 2002, the band toured Europe with 311 and Hoobastank. Incubus played on the Late Show with David Letterman on February 14, 2002. For the remainder of February and March, the group performed throughout Japan and Australia–where they also shot the video for "Warning"–before returning to the US. Incubus embarked on a headlining tour on August 31 with their last concert for Morning View taking place on November 2. This would also be their last show with bassist Alex Katunich who left the band for personal reasons.

Commercial response
Topping all previous Incubus records, Morning View debuted on the Billboard 200 at No. 2 with 266,000 copies sold in its first week. By December 2001, the album was certified platinum and still ranked No. 38 on the Top 200. Many of its singles would remain on the charts throughout the following year. After heavy touring and single rotation, Morning View would be the 40th best selling album of 2002.

Reception

Critical response
The album received generally positive reviews, with a Metacritic score of 62, based on 10 reviews. Q stated that "even at their most acerbic or delicately downplayed extremes, Incubus are compelling", while CDNow noted that Incubus "has begun to grow up a bit."

Rolling Stone wrote in their review, "for a new-metal band competing in a field of alpha males with pierced, sloping brows, the supple, even delicate Incubus have an awful lot of yin in their yang. Unlike Staind, who require a suspension of disbelief that they are, essentially, macho crybabies, and Crazy Town, who probably tinge their mook-hop with Orientalism so they can score with Asian strippers, the coolest thing about Incubus is the way they come front-and-center with their inner little girl. They’ve got the tender lyrics, the nonlinear arrangements, melodies you can soak in and neckbreaker riffs alternating with swaying metallic grooves that somehow say, 'Love me, OK?'." 

Sean Adams of Drowned in Sound gave it a 9 out of 10, writing on November 21, 2001 that, "the really special bit, is the typical hearth-throb frontman, Brandon Boyd. He's got it made. His vocals are something special." Adams further writes, "lyrically there is that little extra you don’t and won't get from many, if any, of their peers. It may sound like self-empowered, dope smoking, hippy rubbish to some, but it's gotta be better for the kidz than some homophobic diatribes, surely?." AllMusic's Deren Svendsen awarded it a similarly high score of four-and-a-half out of five stars, noting, "the ratio of softer and mellower numbers have increased dramatically, to the point where hardcore fans of earlier material may be bewildered. For the most part, the transition works." He adds, "while it may not appeal to fans of the harder material, music lovers who like their rock a little less aggressive and a little more ambitious and, well, sensitive should give Morning View a spin."

Daily Nexus writer Jessica Jardine had a more negative view of the band's soft direction, remarking in November 2001, "the release of the mushy-gushy single 'Wish You Were Here' became an ominous harbinger of the kinder, fuzzier Incubus to come. Without skipping a beat, that’s just what Morning View delivers – into the waiting palms of pre-teen girls everywhere. Slow, acoustic ballads like '11 am' and 'Mexico' are soothing to the ears, but leave me yearning for the Incubus I once knew, loved and head-banged to. The semi-charged 'Have You Ever' and 'Under My Umbrella' remind me of S.C.I.E.N.C.E. but lack the diaphragm-thrusting belts and off-beat experimentalism that once wooed me." She concluded her review by stating, "yes, Brandon, you are a towering heartthrob amid booty-obsessed playa-pimps, but do we really need this saccharin-coated love goo?." NMEs October 2001 review states, "Morning Views insurmountable flaw is that Incubus sell themselves as an intelligent and sensitive rock band, without actually appearing especially intelligent or sensitive. They're hippies, basically."

Dylan P. Gadino of CMJ New Music Monthly compared the album to Faith No More and Linkin Park in November 2001, still considering it to have the same metallic undertone of previous releases. He writes, "on Morning View, the group's third major label album, Boyd and company continue their journey into the metal mystic, guided by familiar cascading chord progressions and ethereal-to-plump dynamic sensibilities. There are aggressive rockers like 'Under My Umbrella' here, but lush yet-harsh metal tunes like 'Blood on the Ground' are more indicative of the album's sound." However, he did note a higher number of acoustic songs in the style of "Drive", observing that, "Morning View shows a softer Incubus, yet it also affirms the group as being visionary among today's hard rockers."

Legacy and accolades
On March 1, 2003, Einziger, along with Scott Litt, Dave Holdredge, and Rick Will, were nominated for a Grammy in the "Best Engineered Album (Non Classical)" category, for their work on Morning View.

In 2005, Morning View was ranked number 374 in Rock Hard magazine's book The 500 Greatest Rock & Metal Albums of All Time. In 2021, Kerrang! ranked it as the 17th best album of 2001, remarking "as really, really, ridiculously good-looking as they were, Brandon Boyd and his Calabasas compatriots were more than just pretty faces." The publication also placed Morning View first when ranking Incubus's studio albums in 2020.

Track listing
Original release
All lyrics written by Brandon Boyd and all music written by Mike Einziger, Alex Katunich, Chris Kilmore, and José Pasillas.

Best Buy Exclusive Limited Edition Bonus CD

Australian Bonus CD

Personnel
Credits adapted from album's liner notes.IncubusBrandon Boyd – lead vocals, percussion
Mike Einziger – lead guitar, pipa on "Aqueous Transmission"
Chris Kilmore – turntables
Dirk Lance – bass guitar
José Pasillas – drumsAdditional musiciansStrings arranged and Conducted by Suzie Katayama
Violins: Joel Derouin, Mario De Leon, Peter Kent, Gerry Hilera, David Stenske, Eve Butler
Violas: Evan Wilson, Karie Prescott
Cello: Larry Corbett, Dan Smith
Woodwinds: Jon Clarke
Assistant Contractor: Marne Boomershine
Background vocals on "Are You In": Dawn Beckham, Stephanie AlexanderProduction'
Produced by Scott Litt and Incubus
Recorded by Rick Will, Dave Holdredge, Mike Einziger, and Scott Litt
Mixed by Rick Will and Scott Litt
Digital Recording/Editing: Dave Holdredge
2nd Engineer: Tom Sweeney
Mastered by Bob Ludwig

Charts

Weekly charts

Year-end charts

Certifications

References

2001 albums
Albums produced by Scott Litt
Incubus (band) albums
Epic Records albums